William Ewart Berry (12 October 1897 – 24 April 1949) was an English cricketer who played for Somerset in one match in 1926. Until the publication of a book on Somerset cricketers in 2017, Berry was believed to be "Wilfred Ernest Berry", born in Hertford on the same date and with an unknown date of death in 1951. He was in fact born in Bridgwater, Somerset, where he also died.

Berry made one first-class appearance for Somerset during the 1926 season, playing against Hampshire at the United Services Recreation Ground in Portsmouth. In the only innings in which he batted, as a tailender, he scored one run, and finished the innings not out. Berry bowled a total of four overs in the match, conceding 34 runs.

Life and career
One of five sons of a Bridgwater grocer, Berry was educated at West Buckland School and followed his father into the grocery business. He played club cricket for Bridgwater Cricket Club as a "googly bowler". His twin brother John Henry Berry also played cricket for Bridgwater. A diabetic, he killed himself at his place of business in 1949 when facing a worsening of his condition.

References

1897 births
1949 suicides
English cricketers
Somerset cricketers
People from Bridgwater
Suicides in England